Somula decora  (Macquart, 1847), the Spotted Wood Fly, is an uncommon species of syrphid fly observed in central to eastern North America. Hoverflies can remain nearly motionless in flight. The adults are also known as flower flies for they are commonly found on flowers, from which they get both energy-giving nectar and protein-rich pollen. The larvae live in decaying wood.

Distribution
Canada, United States.

References

Further reading

External links

 

Eristalinae
Insects described in 1847
Diptera of North America
Hoverflies of North America
Taxa named by Pierre-Justin-Marie Macquart